Vietnam participated in the 2014 Asian Para Games in Incheon, South Korea from 19 – 24 October 2014.

Vietnam won 9 gold medals, 7 silver medals and 13 bronze medals, adding up to a total of 29 and finishing tenth on the medal table.

Competitors

Medal summary

Medal by sport

Medal by Date

Medalists

Multiple Gold Medalists

Athletics

Badminton

Powerlifting

Swimming

Tenpin Bowling

Table Tennis

References

Nations at the 2014 Asian Para Games
2014
Sport in Vietnam
Asian Para Games